is a Japanese footballer who plays for Kataller Toyama.

Career
Born in Miyoshi, Aichi, Hanai attended Miyoshi-Kita junior high school and Toyota-Otani high school in the same outer Nagoya area. He joined Nagoya Grampus Eight youth academy at the age of 7. He was promoted to Nagoya's top team in 2008.

Hanai joined Tokushima Vortis in February 2012 on a free transfer following his release from Nagoya. He made his debut in the 2–1 away win at Giravanz Kitakyushu in the next month, and scored his first goal for the club in Tokushima's 3–0 home win against Gainare Tottori on 20 May 2012.

Club statistics
Updated to 23 February 2020.

References

External links

Profile at Giravanz Kitakyushu
 Sho Hanai career stats at Guardian.co.uk

1989 births
Living people
People from Miyoshi, Aichi
Association football people from Aichi Prefecture
Japanese footballers
J1 League players
J2 League players
J3 League players
Nagoya Grampus players
Tokushima Vortis players
V-Varen Nagasaki players
Giravanz Kitakyushu players
Kataller Toyama players
Association football midfielders